Ottawa Bluesfest is an annual outdoor music festival that takes place each July in downtown Ottawa, Ontario, Canada. While the festival's lineup historically focused on blues music at its inception, it has increasingly showcased mainstream pop, hip hop, reggae, and rock acts in recent years. Bluesfest has become the largest music festival in Canada and the second largest blues festival in North America.

Organization
Since its inception, the festival has been managed by executive and artistic director Mark Monahan. The organization also manages CityFolk Festival (2011-) and the Ontario Festival of Small Halls.

In 2002, Cisco Ottawa Bluesfest won the Best Event Award from the Ottawa Tourism and Convention Authority and in 2003 the organization received the Keeping the Blues Alive (KBA) award for arts education from the Memphis Blues Foundation. Mark Monahan is a past recipient of the Toronto Blues Society's Blues with a Feeling award. In December 2011, Bluesfest reached a five-year sponsorship deal with RBC Royal Bank to ensure its financial stability. Henceforth, the event will be known as RBC Bluesfest.

History

The festival was first held in 1994 at Majors Hill Park with the performance of Clarence Clemons, attracting 5,000 spectators. The following year the festival attracted larger crowds with entertainers like John Hiatt and Buddy Guy. In 1996, 250,000 fans attended the 10-day Bluesfest to see Robert Cray, Los Lobos and others. It was then that the Mitel corporation became the first major sponsor of the event. In 1997, the festival was moved to Confederation Park to provide more space for the increasing number of fans to see musicians such as Dr. John and Little Feat. In 1998, over 800,000 people showed up for the festival in 10 days, which coincided with Canada Day. Bell Mobility and CIBC Wood Gundy joined the list of sponsors. In 1999, the festival was moved to LeBreton Flats. Bluesfest became a registered charitable organization while attracting over 950,000 fans in 10 days. The Royal Canadian Mint became a sponsor. Cisco Systems became the Bluesfest Title Sponsor in 2001, while the Ottawa Citizen and the National Post became Presenting Sponsors. In 2002, Cisco Ottawa Bluesfest moved to Festival Plaza in downtown Ottawa and 1,200,000 fans in 10 days.

In 2003, the festival expanded to eight stages to celebrate its tenth anniversary with 1,220,000 people in attendance. 2005 saw the festival further diversify its offerings, reaching out to a younger audience as well as those interested in more than just blues. The 2006 edition saw continued growth with increased crowds and the move of the MBNA stage to Lisgar Collegiate Institute to provide more capacity. In 2007, Cisco Ottawa Bluesfest relocated to LeBreton Flats Park, a move from the site at Festival Plaza the previous year. The new site offered five stages in and around the Canadian War Museum. The stage set-up featured twin main stages akin to the Austin City Limits Music Festival, which allowed audiences to transfer between headlining acts.

The festival continues to be held in July annually for 10 days. Headliners such as B.B King and the Dixie Chicks (2013), Blake Shelton and Lady Gaga (2014), Kanye West (2015), Red Hot Chili Peppers (2016), and Foo Fighters (2018) attracting approximately 1,500,000 attendees each year.

Along with showcasing international musical talent, Bluesfest is a non-profit charitable organization with year-round music education initiatives such as Blues in the Schools, Be in the Band, and the Bluesfest School of Music and Art, augmenting a focus on developing local artists in the Ottawa region.

Accident 
On July 17, 2011, just 20 minutes into Cheap Trick’s set, a thunderstorm blew through the festival area. The band and crew narrowly escaped the collapse of the stage's 50-ton roof. It fell away from the audience and landed on the band's truck which was parked alongside the back of the stage, breaking the fall and allowing everyone about 30 seconds to escape. Sandy Sanderson, Cheap Trick's truck driver, was treated for a laceration to the abdomen and released from hospital the same day. An investigation by the Ministry of Labour concluded the stage was poorly constructed, and though the report recommended criminal charges, none were filed due to building codes for temporary structures not covering staging that lasted less than 30 days.

Nesting Killdeer 
During preparations for the 2018 festival, a pair of killdeer was found nesting on some cobblestones, which help camouflage the eggs. It was right where the main stage was about to be constructed. Killdeer and their nesting grounds are protected under the Migratory Birds Convention Act. With permission from Environment and Climate Change Canada, and help from the Woodlands Wildlife Sanctuary, the nest was successfully moved 25 meters, one meter at a time, to a protected area behind the stage site, and stage construction was allowed to continue after a 12-hour delay. It marked a first for successful killdeer nest relocation.

Setting 
The outdoor venues :

 RBC Stage on the LeBreton Flats (Capacity 100,000)
 SiriusXM Stage at Bayview Station (Capacity 25,000)
 River Stage at Canadian War Museum (Capacity 8,000)
 Accora Village Spin Stage (Capacity 5,000)

The indoor venue :

 Barney Danson Theatre at Southam Hall (Capacity 2,000)

See also 

List of festivals in Ottawa
List of festivals in Canada
Music of Canada 
List of blues festivals
List of folk festivals

References

External links

 RBC Bluesfest official website
 Ottawa Festivals website

Music festivals established in 1994
Music festivals in Ottawa
Blues festivals in Canada
Annual events in Ottawa